This is a list of Ukrainian football transfers in the winter transfer window  2008–09  by club. Only transfers of the Premier League, 1st League and 2nd League are included.

Premier League

FC Arsenal Kyiv 

In:

Out:

FC Chornomorets Odesa 

In:

Out:

FC Dnipro Dnipropetrovsk 

In:

Out:

FC Dynamo Kyiv 

In:

Out:

FC Illychivets Mariupol 

In:

Out:

FC Karpaty Lviv 

In:

Out:

FC Kharkiv 

In:

Out:

FC Kryvbas Kryvyi Rih 

In:

Out:

FC Lviv 

In:

Out:

FC Metalist Kharkiv 

In:

Out:

FC Metalurh Donetsk 

In:

Out:

FC Metalurh Zaporizhya 

In:

Out:

FC Shakhtar Donetsk 

In:

Out:

SC Tavriya Simferopol 

In:

Out:

FC Vorskla Poltava 

In:

Out:

FC Zorya Luhansk 

In:

Out:

First League

FC Desna Chernihiv 

In:

Out:

FC Dniester Ovidiopol 

In:

Out:

FC Dynamo-2 Kyiv 

In:

Out:

FC Enerhetyk Burshtyn 

In:

Out:

FC Feniks-Illychovets Kalinine 

In:

Out:

FC Helios Kharkiv 

In:

Out:

FC Ihroservice Simferopol 

In:

Out:

FC Knyazha Schaslyve 

In:

Out:

FC Krymteplitsia Molodizhne 

In:

Out:

FC Naftovyk-Ukrnafta Okhtyrka 

In:

Out:

FC Obolon Kyiv 

In:

Out:

PFC Olexandria 

In:

Out:

FSC Prykarpattya Ivano-Frankivsk 

In:

Out:

PFC Sevastopol 

In:

Out:

FC Stal Alchevsk 

In:

Out:

FC Volyn Lutsk 

In:

Out:

FC Zakarpattia Uzhhorod 

In:

Out:

Ukrainian Second League

Druha A

FC Arsenal Bila Tserkva 

In:

Out:

FC Bastion Illichivsk 

In:

Out:

FC Bukovyna Chernivtsi 

In:

Out:

FC CSKA Kyiv 

In:

Out:

FC Dnipro Cherkasy 

In:

Out:

FC Karpaty-2 Lviv 

In:

Out:

FC Knyazha-2 Schaslyve 

In:

Out:

FC Korosten 

In:

Out:

MFK Mykolaiv 

In:

Out:

FC Nafkom Brovary 

In:

Out:

FC Nyva Ternopil 

In:

Out:

PFC Nyva Vinnytsia 

In:

Out:

FC Obolon-2 Kyiv 

In:

Out:

FC Podillya-Khmelnytskyi 

In:

Out:

FC Ros' Bila Tserkva 

In:

Out:

FC Veres Rivne 

In:

Out:

FC Yednist' Plysky 

In:

Out:

Druha B

FC Arsenal Kharkiv 

In:

Out:

FC Dnipro-75 Dnipropetrovsk 

In:

Out:

FC Hirnik Kryvyi Rih 

In:

Out:

FC Hirnyk-Sport Komsomolsk 

In:

Out:

FC Illichivets-2 Mariupol 

In:

Out:

FC Kremin Kremenchuk 

In:

Out:

FC Metalurh-2 Zaporizhya 

In:

Out:

FC Olkom Melitopol 

In:

Out:

FC Olimpik Donetsk 

In:

Out:

FC Poltava 

In:

Out:

PFC Sevastopol-2 

In:

Out:

FC Shakhtar Sverdlovsk 

In:

Out:

FC Shakhtar-3 Donetsk 

In:

Out:

FC Stal Dniprodzerzhynsk 

In:

Out:

FC Titan Armyansk 

In:

Out:

FC Titan Donetsk 

In:

Out:

FC Sumy 

In:

Out:

FC Zirka Kirovohrad 

In:

Out:

See also 
Ukrainian Premier League 2008-09
Ukrainian First League 2008-09
Ukrainian Second League 2008-09
List of Ukrainian football transfers summer 2009

References

External links 
 Ukrainian Football Premier League- official site
 Professional football league of Ukraine – official site
 Football Federation of Ukraine – official site
 Ukrainian Soccer Fan Club (ukrainiansoccer.net) – amateur's site
 UA:Football:News. Ukrainian Football

Transfers
2008-09
Ukrainian